Aleksandar Zorić (17 October 1925 – 17 November 2000) was a Yugoslav cyclist who competed in the individual and team road race events at the 1948 Summer Olympics. The same year he won the Peace Race and the Tour of Yugoslavia.

Zorić was Serbian. His father was killed during World War II, and Zorić lost an eye in 1945 during a bombing of Belgrade. After retiring from competitions he worked as a farmer, and later immigrated to the United States.

References

External links
 

1925 births
2000 deaths
Serbian male cyclists
Yugoslav male cyclists
Olympic cyclists of Yugoslavia
Cyclists at the 1948 Summer Olympics
Sportspeople from Belgrade